The Bangalore–Arsikere–Hubli line is a major railway line in the Indian state of Karnataka connecting state capital  Bangalore with city of Hubli in north-central Karnataka. It traverses across Karnataka and links several cities of Karnataka, including Tumakuru, Kadur, Davanagere, Haveri and Hubballi. Currently, 29 pairs of trains operate in this route, out of which 8 are daily services. Apart from this, this route also links Karnataka with other states, such as Goa, Maharashtra, Gujarat and Rajasthan. This route is also a major feeder line for iron ore, coal and steel hauling freight trains originating from  Ballari district towards the  Mangaluru port.

The maximum operating speed of this route is 100 km/h for passenger trains and 75 km/h for freight trains. The fastest passenger service in this line is Bengaluru–Hubli Jan Shatabdi Express, which covers the two cities in 7h 15m, at an average speed of 64 km/h.

Main line and branches
The main line which is of Bangalore–Arsikere–Hubli section is 469 km in length. this line has five branches
 First branch line which is from Chikkabanavara to Arsikere via Shravanabelagola Hassan is 211 km in length.
 Second branch line which is from Kadur to Chikkamagluru is 45 km in length.
 Third branch line which is from Birur to Talguppa is 160 km in length.
 Fourth branch line which is from Chickjajur to Bellary is 185 km in length.
 Fifth branch line which is from Davangere to Hosapet is 135 km in length.

Doubling and electrification 
Indian railways intends to convert this line into a fully electrified double trunk route. As of December 2022, about 96% (446 km out of 466 km) of the route is doubled. This includes the stretch between Bengaluru–Saunsi. Recently, electrification of the route has been completed between Bengaluru–Tholahunse.

References

5 ft 6 in gauge railways in India
Rail transport in Karnataka
Transport in Hubli-Dharwad
Transport in Bangalore Urban district
Transport in Bangalore Rural district